"" ("Come, God Creator, Holy Ghost") is a Lutheran hymn for Pentecost, with words written by Martin Luther based on the Latin "". The hymn in seven stanzas was first published in 1524. Its hymn tunes are Zahn No. 294, derived from the chant of the Latin hymn, and Zahn No. 295, a later transformation of that melody. The number in the current Protestant hymnal Evangelisches Gesangbuch (EG) is 126.

Johann Sebastian Bach composed chorale preludes on the hymn as BWV 631 in the Orgelbüchlein and as BWV 667 in the Great Eighteen Chorale Preludes. The hymn has been translated and has appeared with the hymn tune in several hymnals.

History 
Luther wrote the hymn for Pentecost as a paraphrase of the Latin  in his effort to establish German equivalents to the Latin parts of the liturgy. He derived the melody from the chant of the Latin hymn. The hymn in seven stanzas was first published in 1524, both in the Erfurt Enchiridion and in a setting by Johann Walter in Eyn geystlich Gesangk Buchleyn. The number in the current Protestant hymnal Evangelisches Gesangbuch (EG) is 126.

Musical settings 

Johann Sebastian Bach used the hymn tune Zahn 295 several times, for example setting it as the four-part chorale BWV 370. He also made organ settings for chorale preludes  including BWV 631 from the Orgelbüchlein and BWV 667 from the Great Eighteen Chorale Preludes. Arnold Schönberg arranged the latter chorale for large orchestra in 1922.

Hymn tune and use in English hymnals 

The hymn has been translated and has appeared to the hymn tune "Komm, Gott Schöpfer" in twelve hymnals, for example "Come, O Creator Spirit Blest", translated by Edward Caswall.

See also 

 List of hymns by Martin Luther

References

External links 

 
 Komm, Gott Schöpfer, heiliger Geist hymnology.co.uk
 Rovi Staff: Johann Sebastian Bach / Komm, Gott Schöpfer, heiliger Geist (III), chorale prelude for organ (Achtzehn Choräle No. 17), BWV 667 (BC K90) AllMusic
 Komm, Gott Schöpfer, heiliger Geist zentrum-verkuendigung.de
 Leaver: Luther's Liturgical Music
 Hahn: Liederkunde zum Evangelischen Gesangbuch

16th-century hymns in German
Hymn tunes
Hymns by Martin Luther
1524 works
Hymns for Pentecost